Museum of the Occupation
 Museum of the Occupation of Latvia
 Museum of Occupations, Tallinn
 Museum of Soviet Occupation (Tbilisi)
 Museum of Soviet Occupation, Kyiv